Hormospira is a genus of small sea snails, marine gastropod mollusks in the family Pseudomelatomidae, containing the single species Hormospira maculosa.

Description
The length of the shell attains 50 mm its diameter 13 mm.

The shell is smooth, or with light revolving striae.  The shoulder of the whorls are angulated and defined by a row of tubercles. The shell is flesh-colored, light brown, or light purplish, with chestnut maculations.

Distribution
This marine species occurs off Sonora, Mexico.

References

External links

 
 Bouchet, P.; Kantor, Y. I.; Sysoev, A.; Puillandre, N. (2011). A new operational classification of the Conoidea (Gastropoda). Journal of Molluscan Studies. 77(3): 273–308
 Abbott R. T. (1974). American seashells. The marine Mollusca of the Atlantic and Pacific coast of North America. ed. 2. Van Nostrand, New York. 663 pp., 24 pls.
 Kantor Yu.I. (1988) On the anatomy of Pseudomelatominae (Gastropoda, Toxoglossa, Turridae) with notes on functional morphology and phylogeny of the subfamily. Apex 3(1): 1–19

Pseudomelatomidae
Monotypic mollusc genera
Gastropods described in 1834
Taxa named by George Brettingham Sowerby I